Archibald Taylor Plantation House is a historic plantation house located near Oxford, Granville County, North Carolina.  It was built about 1840, and is a tall two-story, five bay, transitional Federal / Greek Revival style frame dwelling.  It has a one-story rear ell, exterior end chimneys, and a full-height brick basement.  The house is nearly identical to that built by Archibald Taylor's half-brother, the Col. Richard P. Taylor House.

It was listed on the National Register of Historic Places in 2001.

References

Plantation houses in North Carolina
Houses on the National Register of Historic Places in North Carolina
Greek Revival houses in North Carolina
Federal architecture in North Carolina
Houses completed in 1840
Houses in Granville County, North Carolina
National Register of Historic Places in Granville County, North Carolina